Hipparion (Greek, "pony") is an extinct genus of horse that lived in North America, Asia, Europe, and Africa during the Miocene through Pleistocene ~23 Mya—781,000 years ago. It lived in non-forested, grassy plains, shortgrass prairie or steppes.

Morphology

Hipparion resembled the modern horse, but still had two vestigial outer toes (in addition to its hoof). In some species, these outer toes were functional.

Species

References

Cenozoic mammals of Asia
Cenozoic mammals of North America
Miocene horses
Pliocene horses
Pleistocene horses
Miocene genus first appearances
Pleistocene genus extinctions
Cenozoic mammals of Europe
Cenozoic mammals of Africa
Prehistoric placental genera
Fossil taxa described in 1832